"Changa" is a song by Pnau, released on 11 May 2018 as the third and final single from the band's fifth studio album, Changa (2017). The song features vocals from Kira Divine.

Upon release the band said "This song is an ode to all things multiverse. All that we see is but a dream within a dream. Come dream with us."
 
In December 2018, Billboard staff listed the Blanke remix as one of the 10 best dance remixes of 2018.

Music video
The music video for "Changa" was filmed in Los Angeles, directed by Ben Kutsko from Miniac Films and starred vocalist Kira Divine. Lars Brandle from Billboard called it "a full-on trip which, like its two predecessors, follows the colourful journey of the conscious and unconscious world of DMT."

Track listing
Digital download (remixes)
 "Changa" – 3:25
 "Changa"  – 4:43
 "Changa"  – 5:36
 "Changa"  – 3:19
 "Changa"  – 3:08
 "Changa"  – 4:53

Charts

Release history

References

 

2017 songs
2018 singles
Pnau songs
Songs written by Nick Littlemore
Songs written by Peter Mayes
Songs written by Sam Littlemore